Kuortti is a village in the southern part of the Pertunmaa municipality in Southern Savonia. Together with Pertunmaa's church village (administrative center), it is one of the main settlement centers of the municipality. Kuortti has a population of 252. The village is located near the main road between Heinola and Mikkeli. The distance from Kuortti to Pertunmaa's church village is about 12 kilometres.

References

External links 
 Kuortti - Official Site of the Pertunmaa Municipality

Pertunmaa
Villages in Finland